Sir Harold Brakspear KCVO (10 March 1870 – 20 November 1934) was an English restoration architect and archaeologist.

He restored a number of ancient and notable buildings, including Bath Abbey, Windsor Castle, Brownston House in Devizes and St Cyriac's Church in Lacock. He lived in Corsham, Wiltshire, close to his projects at Lacock Abbey, Hazelbury Manor and Great Chalfield Manor.

Brakspear was appointed Knight Commander of the Royal Victorian Order in the 1931 New Year Honours.

In 1908 he married Lilian Somers of Halesowen, Worcestershire; they had a son and a daughter, Oswald and Mary. Oswald was an architect who designed churches and parsonage houses.

References

External links
 

1870 births
1934 deaths
20th-century English architects
English archaeologists
Knights Bachelor
Knights Commander of the Royal Victorian Order
People from Corsham
Architects from Wiltshire